This article shows all participating team squads at the 1995 FIVB Women's World Cup, held from November 3 to November 17, 1995 in several cities in Japan.

Head Coach: Bernardo Rezende

Head Coach: Mike Burchuk

Head Coach: Lang Ping

Head Coach: Ivica Jelić

Head Coach: Eugenio George Lafita

Head Coach: Raof Abdelkader

Head Coach: Koji Kojima

Head Coach: Sadatoshi Sugawara

Head Coach: Bert Goedkoop

Head Coach: Jorge Sato

Head Coach: Kim Cheol-Yong

Head Coach: Taras Liskevich

References
volleybox website

F
S